Venable is an unincorporated community in northwest Texas County, in the U.S. state of Missouri.

The community is on a ridge at the east end of Missouri Route AA and Ellis Prairie is approximately 2.5 miles west on Route AA. The old Venable School was about three-quarters of a mile to the north-northeast. It is about six miles north-northwest of Houston. The Big Piney River is about two miles to the east.

History
A post office called Venable was established in 1891, and remained in operation until 1920. The community has the name of P. S. Venable, an early citizen.

References

Unincorporated communities in Texas County, Missouri
Unincorporated communities in Missouri